Mersin Aquapark is a waterpark in Mersin, Turkey

Geography
The aquapark is situated to the west of the Atatürk Park and the western breakwater of Mersin Harbor. An amusement park and Müftü River are to the west and the Mediterranean Sea coastline is to the south of the aquapark.

History
The aquapark was established by the Mersin municipality with a total cost of 35 million Turkish liras (During the construction 1.7 TL = $1). But in 2012 a Mersin citizen filed a lawsuit claiming that the establishment does not respect the relevant coastal regulations which give the priority of the coastal usage to public. The court ruled that the establishment must be removed. Mersin municipality challenged the decision.

Details
In the 50-decare aquapark there is an Olympic pool, two children’s pools, diving towers, five  waterslides with different heights and a skating rink. There are also coffee houses, reaturants and a ball room.

References

External links
For images

Mersin
Water parks
Mediterranean Sea